Geoffrey T. Boisi (born  1947) is the founder, CEO and chairman of the Beacon Group, as well as the chairman of Roundtable Investment Partners. He held a number of senior executive roles in investment banks, including JPMorgan Chase and Goldman Sachs.

Education
Boisi graduated from Boston College in 1969. He holds an MBA from the Wharton School of the University of Pennsylvania. Seven years after earning his MBA from Wharton, Boisi became the youngest partner at Goldman Sachs. As the management committee partner, he was given responsibility over the firm's worldwide investment banking activities.

Career
Boisi served as chief executive officer, investment banking officer and vice-chairman of JPMorgan Chase from 2000 to 2003. He is the founding chairman and a senior partner of The Beacon Group, a private equity firm, and currently serves as chief executive officer.

From 1971 to 1993, Boisi served in various positions with Goldman Sachs & Company, including senior general partner and head of the investment banking business.  Boisi co-founded and chair of The National Mentoring Partnership. He serves as member of international advisory board at Oxford Analytica, Ltd. He serves as a trustee associate of Boston College and trustee of Carnegie Corp., of New York and The Brookings Institution. He is a trustee of the Papal Foundation and Joseph P. Kennedy Enterprises. He serves as a director of Oxford Analytica Ltd.

Boisi also serves as director of Communities in Schools. He served as an independent director of Freddie Mac from 2004 to December 2008. Boisi is a graduate from Boston College and co-chairs the capital campaign.

References

1940s births
Living people
American chief executives of financial services companies
Wharton School of the University of Pennsylvania alumni
Boston College alumni